The Mtubatuba Local Municipality council consists of forty-five members elected by mixed-member proportional representation. Twenty-three councillors are elected by first-past-the-post voting in twenty-three wards, while the remaining twenty-two are chosen from party lists so that the total number of party representatives is proportional to the number of votes received.

In the election of 1 November 2021 no party obtained a majority. The Inkatha Freedom Party (IFP) received the most seats with nineteen.

Results 
The following table shows the composition of the council after past elections.

December 2000 election

The following table shows the results of the 2000 election.

March 2006 election

The following table shows the results of the 2006 election.

May 2011 election

The following table shows the results of the 2011 election.

August 2016 election

The following table shows the results of the 2016 election.

August 2016 to November 2021 by-elections
In a by-election held on 23 May 2018, a ward previously held by an ANC councillor was won by the IFP candidate. In another by-election held on 12 December 2018, ANC was able to win a ward previously held by the IFP. IFP won a second ward previously held by ANC in another by-election on 12 June 2019. Ward council composition after the three by-elections is as seen below.

November 2021 election

The following table shows the results of the 2021 election.

By-elections from November 2021
The following by-elections were held to fill vacant ward seats in the period since the election in November 2021.

In ward 9, narrowly held by the African National Congress (ANC) in 2021, the councillor resigned. The ANC failed to register a candidate in time for the resulting by-election, and the Inkatha Freedom Party (IFP) picked up the seat with 77% of the vote, solidifying their coalition in the council.

In ward 4, after the ANC councillor's resignation, the IFP won the resulting by-election.

References

Mtubatuba
Elections in KwaZulu-Natal
Umkhanyakude District Municipality